Girl in the Bunker is a 2018 TV film that aired on Lifetime that told about the kidnapping of Elizabeth Shoaf at the hands of Vinson Filyaw. The film stars Julia Lalonde, Henry Thomas, and Moira Kelly.

Plot

A girl who is sick of being told what to do by her mother decides to walk home from school through the woods. She encounters a man who tells her he is a police officer and that she is under arrest.

Cast

References

External links

2010s crime drama films
2017 films
2017 television films
Crime films based on actual events
Drama films based on actual events
Films about child abduction in the United States
Films set in bunkers
Lifetime (TV network) films